President Haudecoeur (French: Le président Haudecoeur) is a 1940 French comedy film directed by Jean Dréville and starring Harry Baur, Betty Stockfeld and Marguerite Deval. It was shot at the Marseille Studios of Marcel Pagnol in Southern France. The film's sets were designed by the art director Roland Quignon.

Synopsis
A magistrate in Aix-en-Provence rules his family tyrannically and forbids his son to marry the girl he loves as he wants him to marry a wealthy heiress. However, his ordered life is thrown upside down when he encounters a charming Canadian lady.

Cast
 Harry Baur as Le président Haudecoeur  
 Betty Stockfeld as Mrs. Betty Brown  
 Marguerite Deval as Mme Bergas-Larue  
 Robert Pizani as L'abbé Margot  
 Cecil Grane as Pierre Haudecoeur  
 Georges Chamarat as Le cousin Alexis  
 Jean Témerson as Capet  
 André Numès Fils as Brouillon  
 Marcel Maupi as Le jardinier  
 Sonia Gobar as Antoinette  
 Jeanne Provost as Angéline Haudecoeur

References

Bibliography 
 Rège, Philippe. Encyclopedia of French Film Directors, Volume 1. Scarecrow Press, 2009.

External links 
 

1940 films
1940 comedy films
French comedy films
1940s French-language films
Films directed by Jean Dréville
French black-and-white films
1940s French films